Etowah County is a county located in the northeastern part of the U.S. state of Alabama. As of the 2020 census the population was 103,436. Its county seat is Gadsden. Its name is from a Cherokee word meaning "edible tree". In total area, it is the smallest county in Alabama, but one of the most densely populated.
Etowah County comprises the Gadsden Metropolitan Statistical Area.

History
The area was split first among neighboring counties, with most of it belonging to DeKalb and Cherokee counties. On December 7, 1866, the first postwar legislature separated and established Baine County, named for David W. Baine, a politician and Confederate military officer who died in battle in 1862. The county seat was designated as Gadsden.

Because of postwar tensions and actions of insurgents against freedmen, at the state constitutional convention in 1868, the new county was abolished, replaced on December 1, 1868, by one aligned to the same boundaries and named Etowah County, from a Cherokee language word. The Cherokee people in northeast Alabama had been forcibly removed in the 1830s to Indian Territory (now part of Oklahoma) west of the Mississippi River.

20th century to present
Etowah County had issues of racial discrimination and injustice, and Jim Crow. It had one documented lynching between 1877 and 1950, which occurred in 1906. Bunk Richardson, an innocent African-American, only because he was associated with a case in which a white woman was raped and killed. The whites were angry that the governor had commuted the death sentence of one defendant in the case (who was likely also innocent of charges), after two men had already been executed for the crime.

An F4 tornado struck here on Palm Sunday March 27, 1994. It destroyed Piedmont's Goshen United Methodist Church twelve minutes after the National Weather Service of Birmingham issued a tornado warning for northern Calhoun, southeastern Etowah, and southern Cherokee counties.

Geography
It is the smallest county by area in Alabama.

Adjacent counties
DeKalb County – north
Cherokee County – east
Calhoun County – southeast
St. Clair County – southwest
Blount County – west
Marshall County – northwest

Transportation

Major highways

 Interstate 59
 Interstate 759
 U.S. Route 11
 U.S. Route 278
 U.S. Route 411
 U.S. Route 431
 State Route 77
 State Route 132
 State Route 179
 State Route 205
 State Route 211
 State Route 291
 State Route 759

Rail
Alabama and Tennessee River Railway
Norfolk Southern Railway
Tennessee, Alabama and Georgia Railway (Defunct)

Demographics

2000 census
At the 2000 census there were 103,459 people, 41,615 households, and 29,463 families living in the county.  The population density was 193 people per square mile (75/km2).  There were 45,959 housing units at an average density of 86 per square mile (33/km2).  The racial makeup of the county was 82.9% White, 14.7% Black or African American, 0.3% Native American, 0.4% Asian, <0.1% Pacific Islander, 0.7% from other races, and 0.9% from two or more races.  1.7% of the population were Hispanic or Latino of any race.
Of the 41,615 households 29.9% had children under the age of 18 living with them, 54.2% were married couples living together, 13.1% had a female householder with no husband present, and 29.2% were non-families. 26.3% of households were one person and 12.4% were one person aged 65 or older.  The average household size was 2.44 and the average family size was 2.93.

The age distribution was 23.8% under the age of 18, 8.7% from 18 to 24, 27.4% from 25 to 44, 24.1% from 45 to 64, and 16.0% 65 or older.  The median age was 38 years. For every 100 females, there were 91.80 males.  For every 100 females age 18 and over, there were 87.90 males.

The median household income was $31,170 and the median family income  was $38,697. Males had a median income of $31,610 versus $21,346 for females. The per capita income for the county was $16,783.  About 12.3% of families and 15.7% of the population were below the poverty line, including 21.6% of those under age 18 and 13.7% of those age 65 or over.

2010 census
At the 2010 census there were 104,430 people, 42,036 households, and 28,708 families living in the county. The population density was 195 people per square mile (75/km2). There were 47,454 housing units at an average density of 86 per square mile (33/km2). The racial makeup of the county was 80.3% White, 15.1% Black or African American, 0.4% Native American, 0.6% Asian, 0.2% Pacific Islander, 1.9% from other races, and 1.5% from two or more races. 3.3% of the population were Hispanic or Latino of any race.
Of the 42,036 households 27.1% had children under the age of 18 living with them, 49.3% were married couples living together, 14.3% had a female householder with no husband present, and 31.7% were non-families. 28.1% of households were one person and 11.9% were one person aged 65 or older.  The average household size was 2.43 and the average family size was 2.97.

The age distribution was 23.0% under the age of 18, 8.5% from 18 to 24, 24.9% from 25 to 44, 27.8% from 45 to 64, and 15.8% 65 or older.  The median age was 40.2 years. For every 100 females, there were 94.1 males.  For every 100 females age 18 and over, there were 96.5 males.

The median household income was $36,422 and the median family income  was $44,706. Males had a median income of $39,814 versus $30,220 for females. The per capita income for the county was $20,439.  About 13.1% of families and 16.8% of the population were below the poverty line, including 24.6% of those under age 18 and 11.2% of those age 65 or over.

2020 census

As of the 2020 United States census, there were 103,436 people, 40,053 households, and 25,177 families residing in the county.

Government
Etowah County is reliably Republican at the presidential level. The last Democrat to win the county in a presidential election is Bill Clinton, who won it by a plurality in 1996.

Communities

Cities
Attalla
Boaz (partly in Marshall County)
Gadsden (county seat)
Glencoe (partly in Calhoun County)
Hokes Bluff
Rainbow City
Southside (partly in Calhoun County)

Towns
Altoona (partly in Blount County)
Reece City
Ridgeville
Sardis City (partly in Marshall County)
Walnut Grove

Census-designated places

 Ballplay
 Bristow Cove
 Carlisle-Rockledge
 Coats Bend
 Egypt
 Gallant
 Ivalee
 Lookout Mountain
 New Union
 Tidmore Bend
 Whitesboro

Unincorporated communities
 Anderson
 Keener
 Liberty Hill
 Mountainboro
 Pilgrims Rest

Former city
 Alabama City

See also
National Register of Historic Places listings in Etowah County, Alabama
Properties on the Alabama Register of Landmarks and Heritage in Etowah County, Alabama

References

External links

 

Alabama placenames of Native American origin
 
1866 establishments in Alabama
Counties of Appalachia
Populated places established in 1866
Micropolitan areas of Alabama